The 2017–18 season was Puskás FC's 4th competitive season, 1st consecutive season in the OTP Bank Liga and 7th year in existence as a football club.

First team squad
As of 1 February, 2018.

Out on loan

Transfers

Summer

In:

Out:

Statistics

Appearances and goals
Last updated on 23 September 2017.

|-
|colspan="14"|Youth players:
|-
|colspan="14"|Out to loan:

|-
|colspan="14"|Players no longer at the club:

|}

Top scorers
Includes all competitive matches. The list is sorted by shirt number when total goals are equal.

Last updated on 23 September 2017

Disciplinary record
Includes all competitive matches. Players with 1 card or more included only.

Last updated on 23 September 2017

Overall
{|class="wikitable"
|-
|Games played || 10 (10 OTP Bank Liga and 0 Hungarian Cup)
|-
|Games won || 4 (4 OTP Bank Liga and 0 Hungarian Cup)
|-
|Games drawn || 2 (2 OTP Bank Liga and 0 Hungarian Cup)
|-
|Games lost || 4 (4 OTP Bank Liga and 0 Hungarian Cup)
|-
|Goals scored || 15
|-
|Goals conceded || 16
|-
|Goal difference || -1
|-
|Yellow cards || 25
|-
|Red cards || 0
|-
|rowspan="1"|Worst discipline ||  Dávid Márkvárt (4 , 0 )
|-
|rowspan="1"|Best result || 5–1 (A) v Szombathelyi Haladás - OTP Bank Liga - 26-08-2017
|-
|rowspan="1"|Worst result || 0–3 (A) v Debrecen - OTP Bank Liga - 23-09-2017
|-
|rowspan="4"|Most appearances ||  Ulysse Diallo (10 appearances)
|-
|  Balázs Balogh (10 appearances)
|-
|  Jonathan Heris (10 appearances)
|-
|  Patrick Mevoungou (10 appearances)
|-
|rowspan="2"|Top scorer ||  Josip Knežević (5 goal)
|-
|  Ulysse Diallo (5 goal)
|-
|Points || 14/30 (46.67%)
|-

Nemzeti Bajnokság I

Matches

League table

Results summary

Results by round

References

External links
 Puskás FC
 Official Website
 fixtures and results

Puskás Akadémia FC seasons
Hungarian football clubs 2017–18 season